Stuart Francis Harris  (born 14 March 1931) is a retired Australian senior public servant and academic. He was born in London, England.

Early life
Harris grew up in London, attending Tottenham Grammar School. In 1947, at age 16, he moved to Australia under the auspices of the Big Brother Movement, a scheme to facilitate young Britons to move to Australia and work on the land.
After some time working on farms, Harris took a job at the Sydney Branch of the Commonwealth Taxation Department and enrolled in evening classes in economics at the University of Sydney, eventually winning a government scholarship to complete his honours year, achieving his degree in 1956.

Career
After completing his honours degree, Harris transferred to Canberra, initially with the Taxation Department, before moving to the Department of Trade, where he began working closely with (later Sir) John Crawford, who facilitated his gaining a Public Service Fellowship at the Australian National University which enabled Harris to undertake a PhD.

In 1962 Harris joined the then Bureau of Agricultural Economics (BAE), now the Australian Bureau of Agricultural and Resource Economics and Sciences (ABARES), initially as the senior economist. Taking leave from the BAE in 1967-68, Harris worked with the Colombian government on land reform as part of the Harvard Advisory Service mission there. He returned to Australia in mid-1968 to take up the position of Director, BAE, where he was considered to have “contributed to the development of a more professional approach to policy analysis in the BAE.” He also initiated the annual Agricultural Outlook Conference, which continues to this day.

Between 1972 and 1975 Harris was a Deputy Secretary of the Department of Overseas Trade. During his time in the public service, Harris contributed to a number of major government inquiries, such as The Committee of Economic Enquiry (Vernon Report, 1965). In 1974 he led the working group that produced the report on The Principles of Rural Policy in Australia in 1974 which attracted attention from the academic and policy community at the time. In the following year, Harris chaired the Task Force on Economic Policy, which published the report The Processes of Economic Policy Making in Australia (as part of the Royal Commission on Australian Government).. The Task Force also included noted economists Ian Castles and Robert Gregory as members.

In 1975, Harris moved to the Australian National University where he was appointed to the Chair of Resource Economics in the Centre for Resource and Environmental Studies (CRES, later renamed the Fenner School of Environment and Society). He took on the position of Director of the Centre from 1982 to 1984.

Harris was appointed secretary of the Department of Foreign Affairs (DFA) in September 1984 .  In 1986, he published a major report on the role of the DFA in his Review of Australia's Overseas Representation. Harris then oversaw the transition in administrative arrangements in which the Department of Foreign Affairs was reorganised and the expanded Department of Foreign Affairs and Trade was established. Harris retired as secretary of the department in 1988.

After leaving the public service, Harris returned to academic life at the ANU, as Professor of International Relations, specialising in Northeast Asia, particularly China. In 1989, Harris was one of the three chairs appointed to lead the Ecologically Sustainable Development Process, commissioned by the Hawke Government. Based on extensive consultation the chairs presented 9 sectoral papers in 1991 and two further reports on intersectoral issues and greenhouse in 1992.

Since his retirement in 1996, Harris has continued research on China's foreign policy and global relationships as an Emeritus Professor at the Australian National University.

Awards
Harris was made a Fellow of the Academy of the Social Sciences in Australia in 1982. In the 1989 Birthday Honours Harris was made an Officer of the Order of Australia in recognition of distinguished public service.  In 2000, Harris was made a Distinguished Fellow of the Australasian Agricultural and Resource Economics Society. 
Harris was awarded an honorary D.Litt by Murdoch University in 2013.

Notes

References and further reading

1931 births
Living people
Australian National University alumni
Australian public servants
English emigrants to Australia
Officers of the Order of Australia